Caoilfhionn Shanley-Ferguson (24 August  1968 – 7 February 2020), also known as Keelin Shanley, was a journalist, newsreader and presenter with RTÉ, Ireland's national radio and television station, where she had presented the Six One News, alongside Caitríona Perry from January 2018 until her death in February 2020.

Early life
The daughter of Derry Shanley and his wife Orna, Keelin Shanley grew up in Monkstown with her siblings. She studied biochemistry at Trinity College Dublin.

Career
Shanley worked as a reporter and presenter with RTÉ's flagship current affairs television programme, Prime Time for over 10 years, Shanley made a number of award-winning documentaries.

Shanley presented special budget and election coverage, Crimecall, Morning Edition, The Consumer Show and documentary Hacked on RTÉ One, as well as Morning Ireland, Today with Seán O'Rourke and The Late Debate on RTÉ Radio 1. She also worked as a news reporter for Radio France International and for CNN World Report.

Personal life
Shanley lived in Dún Laoghaire.

On 8 February 2020, RTÉ announced that Shanley had died following a two-year battle with cancer, aged 51. She was survived by her husband Conor, their son and their daughter. Shanley, who died on the same day as the 2020 Irish general election, had first been diagnosed during the 2011 Irish general election and spoke of her experience on The Late Late Show in 2013.

References

External links

1968 births
2020 deaths
Alumni of Trinity College Dublin
Deaths from cancer in the Republic of Ireland
Irish radio presenters
Irish women radio presenters
Irish television presenters
Irish women television presenters
Irish journalists
Irish women journalists
Television personalities from Dublin (city)
RTÉ newsreaders and journalists